Daughters of the Rich is a 1923 American silent drama film directed by Louis J. Gasnier and starring Miriam Cooper, Gaston Glass, and Ethel Shannon based upon the 1900 novel of the same name by Edgar Saltus.

Cast
 Miriam Cooper as Maud Barhyte 
 Gaston Glass as Gerald Welden 
 Ethel Shannon as Mademoiselle Giselle 
 Ruth Clifford as Sally Malakoff 
 Josef Swickard as Maud's Father 
 Truly Shattuck as Sally's Mother 
 Stuart Holmes as Duc de Malakoff

Production
In the pre-release version of the film, Marjorie Daw played Cooper's character, Maud Barhyte. Apparently, a decision was made to emphasis Maud in the film over the Ruth Clifford character Sally Malakoff, which resulted in the change in cast for the released version of the film.

Preservation
With no prints of Daughters of the Rich located in any film archives, it is a lost film.

References

Bibliography
 Goble, Alan. The Complete Index to Literary Sources in Film. Walter de Gruyter, 1999.

External links

1923 films
1923 drama films
1920s English-language films
American silent feature films
Silent American drama films
Films directed by Louis J. Gasnier
American black-and-white films
Preferred Pictures films
1920s American films